Neuromedin B (NMB) is a bombesin-related peptide in mammals. It was originally purified from pig spinal cord, and later shown to be present in human central nervous system and gastrointestinal tract.

Sequence 
The sequence of the C-terminal decapeptide is highly conserved across mammalian species: GNLWATGHFM-(NH2); this decapeptide is sometimes noted as neuromedin B, but it is more accurately described as neuromedin B 23-32. The sequence of neuromedin B (in rat) is : TPFSWDLPEPRSRASKIRVHPRGNLWATGHFM-(NH2).

Function 

Neuromedin regulates the following functions:

 exocrine and endocrine secretions
 cell growth
 body temperature
 blood pressure and glucose level
 sneezing

Neuromedin signaling pathway 

NMB acts by binding to its high affinity cell surface receptor, neuromedin B receptor (NMBR). This receptor is a G protein-coupled receptor with seven transmembrane spanning regions, hence the receptor is also denoted as a 7-transmembrane receptor (7-TMR). Upon binding several intracellular signaling pathways are triggered (see Figure 2).

When NMB binds to its 7-TMR, the heterotrimeric G protein that is attached to the receptor is activated. The G-protein is called heterotrimeric because it consists of 3 polypeptides: α subunit, β subunit, and γ subunit.  In the activated NMBR/G-protein complex, there occurs an exchange of GTP for GDP bound to G-α subunit.  The G-α subunit, in turn, dissociated form the G-βγ subunits. The free G-α inactivates adenylate cyclase (AC), which, in turn, catalyzes the conversion of ATP to cAMP, the latter of which functioning as a second messenger. cAMP activates of the enzyme Protein Kinase A (PKA). PKA enters the nucleus and activates the cAMP response element-binding protein. The activated CREB binds along with CREB binding protein, co-activator to the CRE region of the DNA in the nucleus. CREB and CBP are held together by leucine zippers. CRE is the control that activates number of growth factors, and thus cell proliferation and some anti-apoptotic genes.  In the brain, CREB plays a role in long-term memory and learning.

References

External links 
 

Neuropeptides